Harrington Cobblestone Farmhouse and Barn Complex is a historic home and farm complex located at Hartland in Niagara County, New York.  It is a -story cobblestone structure built in 1843 by Vermont native Harry Harrington, in the Greek Revival style.  It features irregularly shaped, variously colored cobbles in its construction. It is one of approximately 47 cobblestone structures in Niagara County.  Also on the property are a full array of historic farm outbuildings.

It was listed on the National Register of Historic Places in 2005.

References

Houses on the National Register of Historic Places in New York (state)
Houses completed in 1843
Greek Revival houses in New York (state)
Cobblestone architecture
Houses in Niagara County, New York
1843 establishments in New York (state)
National Register of Historic Places in Niagara County, New York
Barns on the National Register of Historic Places in New York (state)